Henry Manaton (1650–1716), of Harewood, Calstock, Cornwall, was an English lawyer and Tory politician who sat in the House of Commons at various times  between 1689 and 1713.

Manaton was the son of Henry Manaton of Trecarrell and his second wife Jane Mapowder, daughter of Narcissus Mapowder of Holsworthy Devon. He was admitted at Gray's Inn in 1671 and called to the bar in 1686. He married Martha Andrew, daughter of Solomon Andrew merchant of Lyme Regis on 3 August 1693.

In 1689 Manaton was elected Member of Parliament for Camelford and held the seat until 1695  when he decided not to stand. However he stood for Tavistock after the death of his brother in 1696, but was unsuccessful.  He was re-elected at Camelford in 1698 and held the seat until 1703. During this time he was frequently absent from parliament and put into custody for non attendance. In the 1702 election he had stood for Camelford and Tavistock and petitioned against his defeat at Tavistock. As a result, he was seated for Tavistock in 1703 and gave up his seat at Camelford.  At the 1708 British general election he was returned as Tory MP for Tavistock, but was defeated at Camelford. He voted  against the impeachment of Dr Sacheverell in 1710. At the 1710 British general election, he was returned again as a Tory at Tavistock, but was unseated for flagrant bribery on 3 February 1711.   He was elected again for Camelford in a by-election on 26 March 1711 but was unseated on petition on 8 May 1711. He was by this time the recorder of the town. In 1712 he was elected at a by-election as MP for Callington and held the seat until 1713.   Manaton was frequently in opposition to war with France. He was usually classed as a Tory, although in his last parliament his unpredictable voting had him classed as "whimsical".

Manaton died before 16 May 1716. He left his estates in Cornwall, Devon and Somerset in trust for his cousin Francis Manaton of Manaton.

References

1648 births
1696 deaths
Members of Gray's Inn
Members of the pre-1707 English Parliament for constituencies in Cornwall
English landowners
English MPs 1689–1690
English MPs 1690–1695
English MPs 1698–1700
English MPs 1701
English MPs 1701–1702
English MPs 1702–1705
English MPs 1705–1707
British MPs 1707–1708
British MPs 1708–1710
British MPs 1710–1713
Members of the Parliament of Great Britain for constituencies in Cornwall
Members of the Parliament of England for Tavistock
Members of the Parliament of Great Britain for Tavistock